Roy Alexander Myrie Medrano (born 21 August 1982 in Costa Rica) is a Costa Rican professional football defender who currently plays for Pérez Zeledón.

Club career
Myrie started his career at Alajuelense where he stayed for 7 years.

In 2005, he tested with PSV, but after an injury during the testing, he was sent back to Costa Rica. In June 2008, he signed with Gent and stayed there until the summer of 2012.

KAA Gent
Myrie quickly became a player in the first team during the 2008-2009 season Myrie. His excellent dribbling was remarkable. After the winter he injured his knee and had a long period of rehabilitation. He missed the preparation and the first eight games of the season 2009/2010. He made his debut back in the home match against KVC Westerlo. He made the full game and he also did the next games. Shortly after he got injured again and it took three months before he played a match again. In late 2009 he was allowed to play after 80 minutes against SV Roeselare. After the match, he was as usual again a player in the basic team. But Myrie was unlucky, in early January 2011 he re-injured his knee and he couldn't play for months once again.

In September 2012 he moved to Uruguay De Coronado. After a year at Belén, he joined Pérez Zeledón in summer 2014.

International career
Myrie has played at the 2001 FIFA World Youth Championship and was a member of the Costa Rica national football team at the 2004 Olympics in Athens.

Myrie made his senior debut for Costa Rica in a February 2005 friendly match against Ecuador and has, as of May 2014, earned a total of 22 caps, scoring 6 goals. He represented his country in 7 FIFA World Cup qualification matches and appeared in all four matches and scored twice as Costa Rica won the UNCAF Nations Cup 2005 tournament.

International goals
Scores and results list. Costa Rica's goal tally first.

Personal life
Roy is the elder brother of fellow Costa Rican international defender David Myrie.

References

External links

Profile at Sport.be

1982 births
Living people
People from Limón Province
Association football defenders
Costa Rican footballers
Costa Rica international footballers
Olympic footballers of Costa Rica
Footballers at the 2004 Summer Olympics
L.D. Alajuelense footballers
K.A.A. Gent players
Belén F.C. players
Municipal Pérez Zeledón footballers
Belgian Pro League players
Costa Rican expatriate footballers
Expatriate footballers in Belgium
Liga FPD players
2005 UNCAF Nations Cup players
Copa Centroamericana-winning players